The Video Game History Foundation is a non-profit foundation founded by Frank Cifaldi. The primary aim of the foundation is the archival, preservation, and dissemination of historical media related to video games.

History
In a talk given at the 2016 Game Developers Conference, Frank Cifaldi expressed concern over the state of video game preservation. Noting that a significant amount of feature films produced before 1950 are now irrecoverably lost, Cifaldi found himself wondering if the early history of video games would ultimately suffer the same fate. In highlighting the disparity between modern film preservation and game preservation, Cifaldi lamented that the games industry was doing "a pretty terrible job of maintaining [its] legacy". He said that The Film Foundation, a non-profit organization dedicated to the preservation of film, was a major inspiration for the VGHF.

Prior to the founding of the VGHF, several members of its founding board had collaborated with and donated to the Library of Congress, the Smithsonian American Art Museum, the National Videogame Museum, and the Strong National Museum of Play.

The foundation launched in February 2017, an event which was marked by a collaborative livestream between the VGHF and video game news outlet IGN.

Activities
Per the Video Game History Foundation's mission statement, the foundation's primary goal is to catalog, digitize (rip), and preserve the history of video games. The media preserved by the foundation covers a broad spectrum; in addition to video games, the foundation also archives source code, design documents, press kits, posters, video tapes, newspapers, and photographs. Particular attention is given to preserving the promotional ephemera produced during a game's release window, which may not necessarily be preserved as thoroughly as the games themselves. Cifaldi has characterized this ephemera as being immensely valuable to historians, commenting; "I think that the greatest discoveries we're going to find are on materials that people don't know are important."

The foundation seeks to aid and facilitate video game museums and archives by donating collected material after its preservation. Artifacts in the foundation's possession are often transitory, and are donated to a permanent home after their digitization and archival.

A "digital library" of the VGHF's collected assets is currently under development, a task which Cifaldi estimated would take several years given the size and scope of the project. As an intermediary solution, the foundation periodically selects assets from their "backend library" to upload and publish online. The VGHF has also contracted with Wata Games which manages the evaluation and rating of sealed games for video game collectors prior to sale or auction. Wata has supplied the VGHF details of any prototype games that they have received for review to add to Foundation's database.

The Foundation launched its Video Game Source Project in October 2020, an effort to collect the original source code and other assets for classic video games which it will house in its archives and make available for researchers. The first two games added to this include The Secret of Monkey Island and Monkey Island 2: LeChuck's Revenge. They also included Power Up Baseball, an arcade game that had been in development by Midway in the 1990s in the style of NBA Jam but cancelled due to poor testing results.

References

Foundations based in the United States
Organizations established in 2017
Video game organizations
Organizations based in Oakland, California